Gundal is a village and panchayat in Telangana, India. It falls under Chevella mandal of Ranga Reddy district.

According to the 2011 census of India, it has a population of 2136.

References

Villages in Ranga Reddy district